Johann Franz Purck was a mayor of Vienna.

References 

Mayors of Vienna